Jean-Paul Adam (born 12 June 1977) is a Seychellois politician.  He serves as Minister of Health and Social Affairs in the Cabinet of Seychelles until 30 October 2020.  He previously served as Minister of Finance, Trade & The Blue Economy from 2015 to 2016, and, before that, as Minister for Foreign Affairs from 2010 to 2015.

Education and teaching 
Adams received his early education in Seychelles. He then travelled to the UK, where he obtained a BA (Hons) in English literature and French at the University of Sheffield. After which, he proceeded to complete his MA in international political economy at the University of Manchester.

Between January 2006 to January 2009, Adam taught international politics as a part-time lecturer with the Manchester University and Seychelles Polytechnic Twinning Programme, and, since 2007, has also been a member of the board of trustees of the Seychelles University Foundation.

Political career 
Initially, Adam started his diplomatic career within the Ministry of Foreign Affairs as a trainee protocol officer (1996–1997) and then as second secretary (2001–2004). He later went on to serve as the director general of Presidential Affairs (2006–2007), principal secretary in the Office of the President (2007–2009), and secretary of state in the Office of the President (2009–2010), before being appointed minister for foreign affairs in June 2010.

Personal life 
In addition to his experience as a public servant, on numerous occasions Adam has competed in swimming for Seychelles, often at an international level. In point of fact, he competed in the 1992 Barcelona Olympics, the 1994 World Swimming Championships in Rome, the 1998 World Swimming Championships in Perth, Australia, the 1998 Commonwealth Games, the 2002 Commonwealth Games and the 2003 World Swimming Championships in Barcelona. He won a bronze medal at the 1999 African Games held in Johannesburg, South Africa in the 4 x 200-metre freestyle relay. Moreover, in the Indian Ocean Island Games held in Seychelles, Reunion and Mauritius in 1993, 1998 and 2003 respectively, he also won silver and bronze medals.

Adam is married and has two daughters.

References

External links
  Ministry of Foreign Affairs
  Radiance Media
  Cultural Diplomacy News
  The Report Company
  Picture
 
  Seychelles Nation

1977 births
Living people
Alumni of the University of Sheffield
Alumni of the University of Manchester
Seychellois male swimmers
Olympic swimmers of Seychelles
Swimmers at the 1992 Summer Olympics
Commonwealth Games competitors for Seychelles
Swimmers at the 1998 Commonwealth Games
Swimmers at the 2002 Commonwealth Games
Seychellois male freestyle swimmers
Male medley swimmers
Seychellois sportsperson-politicians
African Games bronze medalists for Seychelles
African Games medalists in swimming
Finance Ministers of Seychelles
Health ministers of Seychelles
Social affairs ministers of Seychelles
Trade ministers of Seychelles
Government ministers of Seychelles
Competitors at the 1999 All-Africa Games
United Seychelles Party politicians
Seychellois people of French descent